Southern Motorway can refer to one of several urban motorways within New Zealand:

Auckland Southern Motorway
Christchurch Southern Motorway
Dunedin Southern Motorway